Grabe is a settlement on the left bank of the Drava River in the Municipality of Središče ob Dravi in northeastern Slovenia. The area belongs to the traditional region of Styria and is now included in the Drava Statistical Region.

The Središče ob Dravi parish church is located in the settlement. It is dedicated to the Holy Spirit and belongs to the Roman Catholic Archdiocese of Maribor. The building dates to the 16th century and the exterior was renovated in 1908.

References

External links
Grabe on Geopedia

Populated places in the Municipality of Središče ob Dravi